Shikarpur district, is a district in Sindh province in Pakistan. The city of Shikarpur is the district headquarters. There are 4 talukas: Lakhi Ghulam Shah, Garhi Yasin, Khanpur and Shikarpur itself. It is spread over an area of 2,512 km2.

History

Shikarpur was an important place as commanding the trade route through the Bolan Pass, and its merchants have dealings with many towns in central Asia. Shikarpur was a city closed within a fort, that fort had seven gates: Hathi Gate, Lakhi Gate, Hazari gate, Khanpur Gate, Suvi Gate, Wagana Gate, Karan Gate & Noshero Gate.

The East India Company occupied Sindh in 1843; They formed three districts in Sindh administratively: Hyderabad, Karachi and Shikarpur.

In 1847 British Government created a new district named Upper Sind Frontier District.

Then the Shikarpur city was the District Headquarters till 1883 until the British Government Shifted District Headquarters to Sukkur. At that time Shikarpur had 14 talukas which covered the area of all North Sindh except Khairpur. Those days Shikarpur District had its boundaries from Kashmore to Dadu district nowadays.In 1901 British Government shifted district status from Shikarpur to Sukkur. Shikarpur was remain a taluka of Sukkur district. In 1977 Shikarpur again get the district status by the Sindh Government.

Geography
Shikarpur district borders Larkana, Jacobabad, Khairpur and Sukkur. Two National Highways (N-65 & N-55) intersect the city of Shikarpur making it the junction points of 4 provinces.

Places 
The Shahi Bagh garden had a zoo with a number of lions, cheetahs, bears, and wild boars. These animals were later shifted to Karachi Zoo. The garden has a wooden pavilion that was designed by Perston Phel and constructed by Sir W. Merewether in September 1871. Many other public and private gardens and open spaces of Shikarpur have vanished.

The Covered Bazaar, contemporary cities of that time – Bukhara, Samarkand, and Istanbul – had bazaars with covered streets. Shikarpur's main bazaar too was covered. The long, narrow bazaar lined with shops on both sides almost pass through the centre of the old city.

Administrative divisions
The district of Shikarpur is sub-divided into four Tehsils these are:

 Garhi Yasin
 Khanpur
 Lakhi
 Shikarpur

Demographics

At the time of the 2017 census, Shikarpur district had a population of 1,233,760, of which 304,441 (24.68%) lived in urban areas. Shikarpur had a sex ratio of 941 females per 1000 males and a literacy rate of 40.48%: 51.65% for males and 28.79% for females. 34.76% of the population were under 10 years of age.

The majority religion is Islam, with 98.39% of the population. Hinduism (including those from Scheduled Castes) is practiced by 1.40% of the population.

At the time of the 2017 census, 92.52% of the population spoke Sindhi, 3.39% Brahui, 1.30% Balochi and 1.22% Urdu as their first language.

Traditional foods of Shikarpur
The traditional foods of Shikarpur are Achar (Pickle) and Kulfi Falooda. The pickle is sold by locals of Shikarpur city, The best pickle you'll find in Shikarpur is sold by locals living in Shah Hussain Mohala Shikarpur; Siddiqis are the locals who have the best pickle in Shikarpur city, the average quality pickle can be found on shops in Bazars(Markets), but for the best quality you must try Siddiqi's pickle. The Deevan Hotel sells the best Kulfi Falooda of Shikarpur, located at Lakhi Dar Shikarpur.

List of Dehs
The following is a list of Shikarpur District's dehs, organised by taluka:

 Shikarpur Taluka (49 dehs)
 Abdal
 Ali Bahar
 Baid
 Barri
 Bekhari
 Bello Machi
 Bello Sultankot
 Chak Chandio Jagir
 Chak Jano
 Chodio Sadhyano Jagir
 Dakhan
 Daro Sono
 Dasti
 Dost Wah
 Ghaloo
 Hamayoon
 Jaggan
 Jahan Wah
 Jano
 Juneja
 Kakepota
 Karan
 Khan Wah
 Khuh Birro
 Lalyoon New
 Lalyoon Old
 Larr-wah
 Lodra
 Machi
 Mir Daho Jagir
 Muhammad Rahim
 Muhbat Fakir Jagir
 Mundho Wah
 Mureed Sethar
 Nimar Thariri
 Nizam Thariri
 Phulpota
 Pir Jalil
 Qazi Wah
 Rahuja
 Rais Wah
 Raj Wah
 Rip
 Shahal
 Shahwani/Chawni
 Shikarpur
 Sultan Kot
 Thahim Wah
 Wakrro Jagir
 Lakhi Taluka (52 dehs)
 Abad Malhi
 Abdoo
 Abdoo Jagir
 Adur Takio
 Aliabad
 Azeemabad
 Azmat Jagir
 Bagi
 Beechanji
 Bello Abad Malhani
 Bello Bageji
 Bello Bagerji Right Side Of Khirthar Canal
 Bhaya
 Bhirkan
 Borirri
 Chak
 Chand
 Dahar Jagir
 Fateh Tando
 Fath Pur
 Gahi Adu Shah
 Garhi Haleem
 Habib Kot
 Hothi
 Jamra
 Jehan Khan
 Jhali Kalwari
 Kalari
 Khahi
 Lakhi
 Maka
 Marri
 Miani
 Mungrani
 Nao Wah
 Nimhoro
 Noroo
 Qasim
 Qazi Wahan
 Ruk
 Rustam
 Sadeded Jagir
 Sahekji
 Sarfoo
 Shahqulipur
 Sherkot
 Soomrani
 Taib
 Theenda
 Usto Abdul Haque
 Wahi Majeed
 Wazirabad
 Khanpur Taluka (52 dehs)
 Ali Murad Kalhoro
 Areeja
 Arsallah
 Begari
 Bello Muhro Marri
 Bhatti
 Bijrani
 Bindi Shahpur
 Burirra
 Chiman Sukhpur
 Choi
 Chutto Loi
 Daranpur
 Darri
 Dhoung
 Garhih Budhal
 Garhi Dakho
 Garhi Taggo
 Jatoi
 Kachokot Shahu
 Katcho Loi
 Khanpur
 Khuhara
 Kumbranwati
 Lodki
 Mahmooda Bagh
 Mahmoodo
 Mian Sahib
 Mir Muhammad Pahore
 Mirza Wah
 Muhro Marri
 Nepiarabad
 Noon
 Noor Muhammad Shujrah
 Pacco Loi
 Pacokot Shahu
 Pahore
 Panah Shujrah
 Panhwar
 Pir Bux Shujrah
 Qutub Katto
 Redhu
 Salehpur
 Shah Wah
 Shahpur
 Tarai
 Thanhrio
 Toung
 Was and Kalhoro
 Zarebello
 Zerkhail New
 Zerkhail Old
 Garhi Yasin Taluka (88 dehs)
 Abdul Rahim Dakhan
 Abid Markiani
 Achar Sadhayo
 Achar Sadhayo Jagir
 Adamji
 Ahsan Junejo
 Ahsan Wah
 Ali Khan Khakhrani
 Amir Shah
 Amrote
 Bambihar
 Bello Andal Dal
 Bello Salaar
 Bopho
 Buxo Ujjan
 Chatto Mangi Sadhayo
 Chhango Rahuja
 Choi Bello
 Dengaro
 Dhoro Ghulam Ali
 Dodo Detho
 Faiz Muhammad Junejo
 Fazuil Josh
 Fazulabad
 Gaheja
 Gahno Wah
 Garhi Jeha
 Garhi Yasin
 Ghulam Qadir Dakhan
 Godo Detho Jagir
 Godo Detho Rayati
 Gowaz
 Habib Jakhro
 Hameed Jagir
 Hasasan Wagan
 Hassan Junejo
 Hazaro
 Howani
 Hussain Hajam
 Jalal Jakhro
 Jam Pario
 Jindho Dero
 Kakepota
 Kandhar
 Katti Pandhi
 Khan Kalhoro
 Khohyari
 Kot Habib Jagir
 Kot Habib Rayati
 Lal Udho
 Madeji
 Mangria
 Miani
 Mirzapur
 Mohammad Hassan Dakhan
 Muhammad Waris Kehar
 Munamabad
 Mundho Kalhoro
 Murad Unar
 Musti Khan Dal
 Nim
 Noaabad
 Noor Gah Unar
 Noshero Abro
 Ourangabad
 Paleja
 Palio Kalhoro
 Phoyari
 Pir Bux Bhutto
 Qabalo
 Qazki Mari
 Rahim Shah
 Saindad Wagan
 Saleem Shah
 Samand Kot
 Sangi
 Sangi Jagir
 Shahpur Jakhro
 Tagio Darudho
 Tajo Dero
 Tando Bahar
 Tarai
 Udha
 Umar Makiani
 Wahni
 Wakar Jaram
 Walisabad
 Wariaso

References

Notes

Bibliography

 
Districts of Sindh